Elohor Elizabeth Isiorho (born 23 March 1980) is a Nigerian modelling agency pioneer, former beauty queen, founder of Beth Model Management Africa and Face of Africa, and entrepreneur with interests spanning modelling, beauty pageantry, event organisation and real estate.

Early life & educational background
Elohor Elizabeth Isiorho was born in England on 23 March 1980. At age two, she and her family moved back to Nigeria. At 16, she returned to London to pursue a bachelor's degree after her secondary school education. She graduated from London Guildhall University (now known as London Metropolitan University) where she studied Business and Information Technology.

Career
As a student, Elizabeth Elohor Isiorho participated in Miss Nigeria UK in 2001, a competition she won. After her victory, she took up modelling. She moved back to Nigeria in 2003 after modeling in the UK for 5 years. Upon returning to Lagos, Nigeria, she founded Beth Models (now Beth Model Management Africa) in 2004, the longest standing modeling agency in Nigeria, which has also been profiled as "Africa’s largest modelling agency." She has worked with international model organizations and models. In 2007, she secured a franchise deal with Elite Model Management Paris to organise 'Elite Model Look Nigeria'.

Elizabeth Elohor Isiorho is known to have discovered and launched the careers of some of the most successful Nigerian models, namely Mayowa Nicholas, the first Nigerian model to grace the [[Victoria Secret’s runway; Victor Ndigwe, Davidson Obennebo, Nneoma Anosike, Jeffery Obed, Tobi Momoh, Olaniyan Olamijuwon, among others.

Isiorho is also Chief Executive Officer of Face of Africa, adjudged to be "the largest casting of models in Africa." She is the C.E.O of Prive Luxury Wedding and Event Company, and Prive Atelier

Recognition & awards
She won Miss Nigeria UK in 2001. She has been featured in several covers and interviews in Forbes, Glamour South Africa, Dazed Digital, Brides, Women of the City, Guardian Life, Vanguard Allure, The Will Downtown, among others. Isiorho has received awards in the fashion and entertainment industry including modelling agency of the year three times in a row, an award for outstanding establishments for establishing the first modelling agency in Nigeria.

References

External link

Modeling agencies
Living people
21st-century Nigerian businesswomen
21st-century Nigerian businesspeople
1980 births
Nigerian business executives